Turnabout was a BBC Television daytime quiz programme that aired on BBC1 from 26 March 1990 to 7 October 1996. The programme was hosted by Rob Curling.

Format
Three contestants competed to solve word puzzles and play various games. Each was assigned a colour: red, green (orange in series 1), or blue. After the final game was complete, the contestant with the highest score was declared the day's winner. The winners and highest-scoring losers during a series were invited back at its end to compete in a tournament for prizes.

Sphere Game
This game was played with a 4-by-4 grid of 16 spheres. The host specified a sequence of three letters that had to appear in each correct word and asked a series of toss-ups on the buzzer. For each toss-up, a string of blanks was shown to indicate the number of letters in the word, with the three given ones already filled in. (E.g. LAB----- and a clue of "hired worker" would lead to LABOURER.) A correct buzz-in answer allowed the contestant to change the colour of one sphere, but a miss deducted 5 points from their score and allowed the contestant who had buzzed-in second (if any) to answer.

Each player started the game with four spheres of their own colour already on the board, and the remaining four were grey. The rules on changing sphere colours varied. Originally, a contestant could choose any sphere after a correct answer; a grey one (in the centre of the board) would turn directly to their colour, while any other sphere would advance in a three-step cycle, from red to orange to blue and back to red. Later, the four grey spheres were moved to the corners and had to be changed before any others could be selected, and any chosen sphere would go directly to that contestant's colour.

Contestants scored 5 points for making a horizontal/vertical/diagonal row of three spheres in their own colour, or 10 points for a line of four. If a move created multiple scoring lines, the contestant earned points for all of them. The round ended after three minutes had elapsed, and a second round was immediately played with the three-letter sequence reversed (e.g. "LAB" becoming "BAL"). The grid was not reset between the two rounds. When the grey spheres were placed in the corners, the starting arrangement of the board was such that all four of them had to be changed before any contestant could make a scoring line.

In the first series, the highest-scoring contestant at the end of both rounds advanced to play the Star Game, then played the same two opponents in another Sphere Game round with the scores reset to zero. The board was not reset, however, and the colour cycle ran in reverse order (blue to orange to red).

If a game or episode ended in a tie for high score, the contestant with more spheres in their own colour was the winner.

Palindrome Game (1994–95)
This round was played identically to the Sphere Game, but the three given letters read the same forwards and backwards (e.g. "ELE").

Star Game
In the first series, the winner of the Sphere Game played this round alone, using a grid of 16 words that each contained one of the two three-letter sequences that had just been used. They had 10 seconds to study the grid, then 50 seconds to match the words with clues given by the host. Five points were awarded for each correct answer; the contestant was not allowed to return to any passed or missed clues.

From Series 2 onwards, all three contestants had a chance to play the Star Game in ascending order of score from the previous round. Each chose one of three sequences that all contained the same three letters (e.g. SIT, TIS, STI), which would appear in all of their words.

About Turn (1996)
The contestants were shown a word with three consecutive letters removed, which formed a word of their own, and the host read a clue on the buzzer. Giving the correct three-letter word scored 15 points for the contestant in third place, 10 for the contestant in second, or 5 for the leader. A miss deducted 5 points.

Transmissions

References

External links

1990 British television series debuts
1996 British television series endings
1990s British game shows
BBC television game shows
English-language television shows
Lost BBC episodes